SES, S.E.S., Ses and similar variants can refere to:

Business and economics
 Socioeconomic status
 Scottish Economic Society, a learned society in Scotland 
 SES, callsign of the TV station SES/RTS (Mount Gambier, South Australia)
 SES S.A., a satellite owner and operator
 Single Economic Space or Eurasian Economic Space, a project of economical integration of five post-Soviet states: Belarus, Kazakhstan,  Russia, Armenia, and Kyrgyzstan
 Single European Sky
 Stock Exchange of Singapore
 Subud Enterprise Services

Science and technology
 Science and Engineering South, a consortium of 6 research-intensive public universities in the Southeast of England, UK
 Sedimentation Enhancing Strategy, an environmental management project for land-building in river deltas
 Service Engine Soon, a warning message on modern automobiles
 Service Evaluation System, an Operations Support System used by telephone companies
 Ses Hübner, a fungus moth genus nowadays synonymized with Tinea
 Small Edison Screw, a variety of the Edison screw standard light bulb fitting
 Socio-ecological system
 Solvent excluded surface, a chemistry-related term
 Standard Event System, a guideline to study vertebrate embryos
 Surface effect ship, a class of ship that has both an air cushion (like a hovercraft) and twin hulls (like a catamaran)
 Seismic Electric Signals, in seismology

Computer technology
 SCSI Enclosure Services, a computer protocol for management of disk storage enclosures
 Search Engine Strategies, a search engine marketing conference and expo
 SecureEasySetup, a technology developed by Broadcom to easily set up wireless LANs with Wi-Fi Protected Access
 Sequence Execution System, a WinCC option used for batch production
 Signed Envelope Sender, a predecessor email sender validation protocol to Bounce Address Tag Validation
 Amazon Simple Email Service, part of Amazon.com's cloud computing suite (AWS)
 .SES (session file), industry-standard export file format of Specctra-compatible autorouters

Education
 School of Environmental Studies (disambiguation), multiple schools
 School of Economic Science in London, England
 Saraswati Education Society in Karjat, India
 Saraswati Education Society's High School and Junior College in Thane, India
 Sanjay Education Society's College of Engineering and Polytechnic in Dhule, India
 Southern Evangelical Seminary in Charlotte, North Carolina
 Sunnyside Environmental School in Portland, Oregon
 Shanghai Experimental School, a ten-year 112 school in Shanghai, China

Popular culture
 Ses (film) (The Voice), a 2010 Turkish horror film
 S.E.S. (group), (Sea, Eugene, Shoo), a Korean girl group
 Sex, Ecology, Spirituality, a 2001 book by Integral philosopher Ken Wilber
 Smile Empty Soul, an American post-grunge band from California
 Smile Empty Soul (album)
 Straight Edge Society, a professional wrestling stable

People
 Stephan El Shaarawy (born 1992), professional footballer for A.S. Roma

Geography
 Ses, alternate name of Sers, Armenia
 Șes, a village in Bunești Commune, Suceava County, Romania
 Șes (Pârâul de Câmpie), a river in Romania
 Șes (Râul Mare), a river in Romania

Other uses
 Senior Executive Service (United States), a civil service classification in the United States federal government
 Blue Shirts Society, also known as Spirit Encouragement Society, a Fascist clique and secret police or para-military force in the Republic of China between 1931 and 1938
 State Emergency Service, a number of volunteer emergency response organisations in Australia, with most state organisations referred to as SES
 State Emergency Service of Ukraine, emergency response organization in the Ukraine
 ses, ISO 639-3 code for Koyraboro Senni
 ses, a variant of the Solresol language
 Spiritual Exercises (disambiguation)